Arlington Peak is a  high peak within the Santa Ynez Mountains located north of Santa Barbara, California, adjacent to the south of La Cumbre Peak and to the southeast of Cathedral Peak.  The name of the peak purportedly originated in 1889 from the staff of the Arlington Hotel who referred to the area comprising the three peaks as The Arlington Crags.  Arlington Peak was officially named in 2004 by the United States Board on Geographic Names.

The peak is accessible via a  "out and back" trail used for hiking and rock climbing, which is rated as difficult. There have been occasional incidents where hikers were injured and required evacuation.

Geology
Arlington Peak is primarily composed of Matilija Sandstone

References

Mountains of Santa Barbara County, California
Santa Ynez Mountains
Mountains of Southern California